A Lady with a Song is a studio album by American jazz singer Nancy Wilson released by Columbia Records in 1990. The album reached number two on the Billboard 200 chart and No. 8 on the Billboard Contemporary Jazz Albums chart.

The album produced four singles, with two of them reaching the Billboard Hot 100.

Reception
William Ruhlmann of AllMusic wrote "The arrangements are full of electronic keyboard washes, popping basslines, and soulful female backup vocals with the occasional piercing saxophone part, all in support of (and at times overwhelming) Wilson's smoky alto vocals... But the quality of the songwriting lets Wilson down, and, anyway, the approach is not natural to her. She is jazzier and classier than this kind of thing, and while she made a valiant attempt to meet the R&B charts more than halfway, she is not heard at her best here".

Track listing

Charts

References

1990 albums
Nancy Wilson (jazz singer) albums
Columbia Records albums